Norton County is an Aubrite meteorite that fell in 1948 in Kansas, United States.

History
After a brilliant fireball and a loud noise, a very large shower of meteorites fell over a large area of Norton County (Kansas) and Furnas County (Nebraska) on February 18, 1948. On April 28, a research team from the University of New Mexico set out to identify and recover pieces of the meteorite. Everything that they recovered was either donated to or sold to the university.

Composition and classification
Norton County is a Ca-poor aubrite fragmental breccia.

Specimens
The main mass (about ) is the center piece of the meteorite display at the University of New Mexico in Albuquerque.

See also 
 Glossary of meteoritics
 Meteorite

Notes

External links 
 Meteoritical Bulletin Database

Meteorites found in the United States
Geology of Kansas
1948 in the United States
1948 in science
1948 in Kansas
Asteroidal achondrites